Hind Aboud Kabawat is a Syrian-Canadian international counsel, Director of Interfaith Peacebuilding at George Mason University's Center for World Religions, Diplomacy, and Conflict Resolution and deputy head of the Syrian Negotiation Commission's Geneva Office.

Career 
Hind Kabawat is the deputy head of the Syrian Negotiation Commission's Geneva Office, which is headed by Ambassador Abdullatif Dabbagh, former Syrian ambassador to the UAE. The Syrian Negotiation Commission was formerly known as the High Negotiations Committee (HNC). In her position at the then HNC, she participated in all eight rounds of the Geneva peace talks on Syria (2017). Hind Kabawat also serves as Director of Interfaith Peacebuilding at George Mason University's Center for World Religions, Diplomacy, and Conflict Resolution (CRDC). As part of her position at CRDC, she directs CRDC's Syria program, which includes yearly overseas seminars in which she serves as an adjunct professor for graduate and undergraduate students to learn about conflict resolution interventions and civil society development. Through this program, she has also directed civil society and interfaith collaboration training for Syrians of various ages and with IDP and refugee status.

Hind Kabawat is a founding member of Tastakel, a women's center dedicated to using non-violence and dialogue to address the ongoing conflict in Syria. This includes the running of multiple women's centers in Syria which provide education and counseling services, as well as hosting workshops on political engagement and peace-building for Syrian women both inside Syria and living as refugees in neighboring countries.

Until 2015, Hind Kabawat was a Senior Program Officer at the United States Institute of Peace. She formerly served as an advisory board member and consultant for the World Bank and is a frequent contributor to the Huffington Post. From 1989 to 2014, Hind worked as international counsel in various law firms in Toronto.

Awards 
In 2007, Hind Kabawat was named a Peacemaker in Action by the Tanenbaum Center for Interreligious Understanding. In 2009, Hind received the Public Diplomacy Award from CRDC at George Mason University.

Education 
Hind Kabawat has a BA in Economics from Damascus University, and a law degree from the Arab University in Beirut. She holds an MA in International Relations from Tufts University's Fletcher School of Law and Diplomacy, and certificates in Conflict Resolution and Strategy Leadership from the University of Toronto and in Negotiation from Harvard University.

References 

Living people
Damascus University alumni
The Fletcher School at Tufts University alumni
Year of birth missing (living people)